The mind–body problem is a philosophical debate concerning the relationship between thought and consciousness in the human mind, and the brain as part of the physical body. The debate goes beyond addressing the mere question of how mind and body function chemically and physiologically. Interactionism arises when mind and body are considered as distinct, based on the premise that the mind and the body are fundamentally different in nature.

The problem was popularized by René Descartes in the 17th century, resulting in Cartesian dualism, and by pre-Aristotelian philosophers, in Avicennian philosophy, and in earlier Asian traditions. A variety of approaches have been proposed. Most are either dualist or monist. Dualism maintains a rigid distinction between the realms of mind and matter. Monism maintains that there is only one unifying reality as in neutral or substance or essence, in terms of which everything can be explained.

Each of these categories contains numerous variants. The two main forms of dualism are substance dualism, which holds that the mind is formed of a distinct type of substance not governed by the laws of physics, and property dualism, which holds that mental properties involving conscious experience are fundamental properties, alongside the fundamental properties identified by a completed physics. The three main forms of monism are physicalism, which holds that the mind consists of matter organized in a particular way; idealism, which holds that only thought truly exists and matter is merely a representation of mental processes; and neutral monism, which holds that both mind and matter are aspects of a distinct essence that is itself identical to neither of them. Psychophysical parallelism is a third possible alternative regarding the relation between mind and body, between interaction (dualism) and one-sided action (monism).

Several philosophical perspectives which reject the mind–body dichotomy have been developed. The historical materialism of Karl Marx and subsequent writers, itself a form of physicalism, held that consciousness was engendered by the material contingencies of one's environment. An explicit rejection of the dichotomy is found in French structuralism, and is a position that generally characterized post-war Continental philosophy.

The absence of an empirically identifiable meeting point between the non-physical mind (if there is such a thing) and its physical extension (if there is such a thing) has been raised as a criticism of dualism, and many modern philosophers of mind maintain that the mind is not something separate from the body. These approaches have been particularly influential in the sciences, particularly in the fields of sociobiology, computer science, evolutionary psychology, and the neurosciences.

An ancient model of the mind known as the Five-Aggregate Model, described in the Buddhist teachings, explains the mind as continuously changing sense impressions and mental phenomena. Considering this model, it is possible to understand that it is the constantly changing sense impressions and mental phenomena (i.e., the mind) that experiences/analyzes all external phenomena in the world as well as all internal phenomena including the body anatomy, the nervous system as well as the organ brain. This conceptualization leads to two levels of analyses: (i) analyses conducted from a third-person perspective on how the brain works, and (ii) analyzing the moment-to-moment manifestation of an individual's mind-stream (analyses conducted from a first-person perspective). Considering the latter, the manifestation of the mind-stream is described as happening in every person all the time, even in a scientist who analyses various phenomena in the world, including analyzing and hypothesizing about the organ brain.

Mind–body interaction and mental causation
Philosophers David L. Robb and John F. Heil introduce mental causation in terms of the mind–body problem of interaction:

Contemporary neurophilosopher Georg Northoff suggests that mental causation is compatible with classical formal and final causality.

Biologist, theoretical neuroscientist and philosopher, Walter J. Freeman, suggests that explaining mind–body interaction in terms of "circular causation" is more relevant than linear causation.

In neuroscience, much has been learned about correlations between brain activity and subjective, conscious experiences. Many suggest that neuroscience will ultimately explain consciousness:
"...consciousness is a biological process that will eventually be explained in terms of molecular signaling pathways used by interacting populations of nerve cells..." However, this view has been criticized because consciousness has yet to be shown to be a process, and the "hard problem" of relating consciousness directly to brain activity remains elusive.

Since 1927, at the Solvay Conference in Austria, European physicists of the late 19th and early 20th centuries, realized that the interpretations of their experiments with light and electricity required a different theory to explain why light behaves both as a wave and particle. The implications were profound. The usual empirical model of explaining natural phenomena could not account for this duality of matter and non-matter. In a significant way, this has brought back the conversation on the mind-body duality.

Neural correlates

The neural correlates of consciousness "are the smallest set of brain mechanisms and events sufficient for some specific conscious feeling, as elemental as the color red or as complex as the sensual, mysterious, and primeval sensation evoked when looking at [a] jungle scene..." Neuroscientists use empirical approaches to discover neural correlates of subjective phenomena.

Neurobiology and neurophilosophy

A science of consciousness must explain the exact relationship between subjective conscious mental states and brain states formed by electrochemical interactions in the body, the so-called hard problem of consciousness. Neurobiology studies the connection scientifically, as do neuropsychology and neuropsychiatry. Neurophilosophy is the interdisciplinary study of neuroscience and philosophy of mind. In this pursuit, neurophilosophers, such as Patricia Churchland, Paul Churchland and Daniel Dennett, have focused primarily on the body rather than the mind. In this context, neuronal correlates may be viewed as causing consciousness, where consciousness can be thought of as an undefined property that depends upon this complex, adaptive, and highly interconnected biological system. However, it's unknown if discovering and characterizing neural correlates may eventually provide a theory of consciousness that can explain the first-person experience of these "systems", and determine whether other systems of equal complexity lack such features.

The massive parallelism of neural networks allows redundant populations of neurons to mediate the same or similar percepts. Nonetheless, it is assumed that every subjective state will have associated neural correlates, which can be manipulated to artificially inhibit or induce the subject's experience of that conscious state. The growing ability of neuroscientists to manipulate neurons using methods from molecular biology in combination with optical tools was achieved by the development of behavioral and organic models that are amenable to large-scale genomic analysis and manipulation. Non-human analysis such as this, in combination with imaging of the human brain, have contributed to a robust and increasingly predictive theoretical framework.

Arousal and content
There are two common but distinct dimensions of the term consciousness, one involving arousal and states of consciousness and the other involving content of consciousness and conscious states. To be conscious of something, the brain must be in a relatively high state of arousal (sometimes called vigilance), whether awake or in REM sleep. Brain arousal level fluctuates in a circadian rhythm but these natural cycles may be influenced by lack of sleep, alcohol and other drugs, physical exertion, etc. Arousal can be measured behaviorally by the signal amplitude required to trigger a given reaction (for example, the sound level that causes a subject to turn and look toward the source). High arousal states involve conscious states that feature specific perceptual content, planning and recollection or even fantasy. Clinicians use scoring systems such as the Glasgow Coma Scale to assess the level of arousal in patients with impaired states of consciousness such as the comatose state, the persistent vegetative state, and the minimally conscious state. Here, "state" refers to different amounts of externalized, physical consciousness: ranging from a total absence in coma, persistent vegetative state and general anesthesia, to a fluctuating, minimally conscious state, such as sleep walking and epileptic seizure.

Many nuclei with distinct chemical signatures in the thalamus, midbrain and pons must function for a subject to be in a sufficient state of brain arousal to experience anything at all. These nuclei therefore belong to the enabling factors for consciousness. Conversely it is likely that the specific content of any particular conscious sensation is mediated by particular neurons in the cortex and their associated satellite structures, including the amygdala, thalamus, claustrum and the basal ganglia.

Types of dualism 

The following is a very brief account of some contributions to the mind–body problem.

Interactionism 

The viewpoint of interactionism suggests that the mind and body are two separate substances, but that each can affect the other. This interaction between the mind and body was first put forward by the philosopher René Descartes. Descartes believed that the mind was non-physical and permeated the entire body, but that the mind and body interacted via the pineal gland. This theory has changed throughout the years, and in the 20th century its main adherents were the philosopher of science Karl Popper and the neurophysiologist John Carew Eccles. A more recent and popular version of Interactionism is the viewpoint of emergentism. This perspective states that mental states are a result of the brain states, and that the mental events can then influence the brain, resulting in a two way communication between the mind and body.

Epiphenomenalism 

The viewpoint of epiphenomenalism suggests that the physical brain can cause mental events in the mind, but that the mind cannot interact with the brain at all; stating that mental occurrences are simply a side effect of the brain's processes. This viewpoint explains that while one's body may react to them feeling joy, fear, or sadness, that the emotion does not cause the physical response. Rather, it explains that joy, fear, sadness, and all bodily reactions are caused by chemicals and their interaction with the body.

Psychophysical parallelism 

The viewpoint of psychophysical parallelism suggests that the mind and body are entirely independent from one another. Furthermore, this viewpoint states that both mental and physical stimuli and reactions are experienced simultaneously by both the mind and body, however, there is no interaction nor communication between the two.

Double aspectism 

Double aspectism is an extension of psychophysical parallelism which also suggests that the mind and body cannot interact, nor can they be separated. Baruch Spinoza and Gustav Fechner were two of the notable users of double aspectism, however, Fechner later expanded upon it to form the branch of psychophysics in an attempt to prove the relationship of the mind and body.

Pre-established harmony 

The viewpoint of pre-established harmony is another offshoot of psychophysical parallelism which suggests that mental events and bodily events are separate and distinct, but that they are both coordinated by an external agent, an example of such an agent could be God or another deity. A notable adherent to the idea of pre-established harmony is Gottfried Wilhelm von Leibniz in his theory of Monadology. His explanation of pre-established harmony relied heavily upon God as the external agent who coordinated the mental and bodily events of all things in the beginning.

Occasionalism 

The viewpoint of Occasionalism is another offshoot of psychophysical parallelism, however, the major difference is that the mind and body have some indirect interaction. Occasionalism suggests that the mind and body are separate and distinct, but that they interact through divine intervention. Nicolas de Malebranche was one of the main contributors to this idea, using it as a way to address his disagreements with Descartes' view of the mind-body problem. In Malebranche's occasionalism, he viewed thoughts as a wish for the body to move, which was then fulfilled by God causing the body to act.

Historical background

The Buddha

The Buddha (480–400 B.C.E), founder of Buddhism, described the mind and the body as depending on each other in a way that two sheaves of reeds were to stand leaning against one another and taught that the world consists of mind and matter which work together, interdependently. Buddhist teachings describe the mind as manifesting from moment to moment, one thought moment at a time as a fast flowing stream. The components that make up the mind are known as the five aggregates (i.e., material form, feelings, perception, volition, and sensory consciousness), which arise and pass away continuously. The arising and passing of these aggregates in the present moment is described as being influenced by five causal laws: biological laws, psychological laws, physical laws, volitional laws, and universal laws. The Buddhist practice of mindfulness involves attending to this constantly changing mind-stream.

Ultimately, the Buddha's philosophy is that both mind and forms are conditionally arising qualities of an ever-changing universe in which, when nirvāna is attained, all phenomenal experience ceases to exist. According to the anattā doctrine of the Buddha, the conceptual self is a mere mental construct of an individual entity and is basically an impermanent illusion, sustained by form, sensation, perception, thought and consciousness. The Buddha argued that mentally clinging to any views will result in delusion and stress, since, according to the Buddha, a real self (conceptual self, being the basis of standpoints and views) cannot be found when the mind has clarity.

Plato

Plato (429–347 B.C.E.) believed that the material world is a shadow of a higher reality that consists of concepts he called Forms. According to Plato, objects in our everyday world "participate in" these Forms, which confer identity and meaning to material objects. For example, a circle drawn in the sand would be a circle only because it participates in the concept of an ideal circle that exists somewhere in the world of Forms. He argued that, as the body is from the material world, the soul is from the world of Forms and is thus immortal. He believed the soul was temporarily united with the body and would only be separated at death, when it, if pure, would return to the world of Forms; otherwise, reincarnation follows. Since the soul does not exist in time and space, as the body does, it can access universal truths. For Plato, ideas (or Forms) are the true reality, and are experienced by the soul. The body is for Plato empty in that it can not access the abstract reality of the world; it can only experience shadows. This is determined by Plato's essentially rationalistic epistemology.

Aristotle

For Aristotle (384–322 BC) mind is a faculty of the soul. Regarding the soul, he said:

In the end, Aristotle saw the relation between soul and body as uncomplicated, in the same way that it is uncomplicated that a cubical shape is a property of a toy building block. The soul is a property exhibited by the body, one among many. Moreover, Aristotle proposed that when the body perishes, so does the soul, just as the shape of a building block disappears with destruction of the block.

Medieval Aristotelianism
Working in the Aristotelian-influenced tradition of Thomism, Thomas Aquinas (1225–1274), like Aristotle, believed that the mind and the body are one, like a seal and wax; therefore, it is pointless to ask whether or not they are one.  However, (referring to "mind" as "the soul") he asserted that the soul persists after the death of the body in spite of their unity, calling the soul "this particular thing".  Since his view was primarily theological rather than philosophical, it is impossible to fit it neatly within either the category of physicalism or dualism.

Influences of Eastern monotheistic religions

In religious philosophy of Eastern monotheism, dualism denotes a binary opposition of an idea that contains two essential parts. The first formal concept of a "mind-body" split may be found in the divinity–secularity dualism of the ancient Persian religion of Zoroastrianism around the mid-fifth century BC. Gnosticism is a modern name for a variety of ancient dualistic ideas inspired by Judaism popular in the first and second century AD. These ideas later seem to have been incorporated into Galen's "tripartite soul" that led into both the Christian sentiments  expressed in the later Augustinian theodicy and Avicenna's Platonism in Islamic Philosophy.

Descartes

René Descartes (1596–1650) believed that mind exerted control over the brain via the pineal gland:

His posited relation between mind and body is called Cartesian dualism or substance dualism. He held that mind was distinct from matter, but could influence matter. How such an interaction could be exerted remains a contentious issue.

Kant

For Kant (1724–1804) beyond mind and matter there exists a world of a priori forms, which are seen as necessary preconditions for understanding. Some of these forms, space and time being examples, today seem to be pre-programmed in the brain.

Kant views the mind–body interaction as taking place through forces that may be of different kinds for mind and body.

Huxley

For Huxley (1825–1895) the conscious mind was a by-product of the brain that has no influence upon the brain, a so-called epiphenomenon.

Whitehead

A. N. Whitehead advocated a sophisticated form of panpsychism that has been called by David Ray Griffin panexperientialism.

Popper

For Popper (1902–1994) there are three aspects of the mind–body problem: the worlds of matter, mind, and of the creations of the mind, such as mathematics. In his view, the third-world creations of the mind could be interpreted by the second-world mind and used to affect the first-world of matter. An example might be radio, an example of the interpretation of the third-world (Maxwell's electromagnetic theory) by the second-world mind to suggest modifications of the external first world.

Searle

For Searle (b. 1932) the mind–body problem is a false dichotomy; that is, mind is a perfectly ordinary aspect of the brain. Searle proposed Biological naturalism in 1980.

Ryle

With his book, The Concept of Mind, Gilbert Ryle "was seen to have put the final nail in the coffin of Cartesian dualism".

In the chapter "Descartes' Myth," Ryle introduces "the dogma of the Ghost in the machine" to describe the philosophical concept of the mind as an entity separate from the body:I hope to prove that it is entirely false, and false not in detail but in principle. It is not merely an assemblage of particular mistakes. It is one big mistake and a mistake of a special kind. It is, namely, a category mistake.

See also

General

 Bodymind
 Chinese room
 Cognitive closure (philosophy)
 Cognitive neuroscience
 Connectionism
 Consciousness in animals
 Downward causation
 Descartes' Error
 Embodied cognition
 Existentialism
 Explanatory gap
 Free will
 Ideasthesia
 Namarupa (Buddhist concept)
 Neuroscience of free will
 Philosophical zombie
 Philosophy of artificial intelligence
 Pluralism
 Problem of other minds
 Reductionism
 Sacred–profane dichotomy
 Sentience
 Strange loop (self-reflective thoughts)
 The Mind's I (book on the subject)
 Turing test
 Vertiginous question
 William H. Poteat

References

Bibliography
 

 
 
 
 Kim, J. (1995). "Mind–Body Problem", Oxford Companion to Philosophy. Ted Honderich (ed.). Oxford: Oxford University Press.
 
 Massimini, M.; Tononi, G. (2018). Sizing up Consciousness: Towards an Objective Measure of the Capacity for Experience. Oxford University Press.
 Turner, Bryan S. (1996). The Body and Society: Exploration in Social Theory.

External links

 
 Plato's Middle Period Metaphysics and Epistemology - The Stanford Encyclopedia of Philosophy
 
 The Mind/Body Problem, BBC Radio 4 discussion with Anthony Grayling, Julian Baggini & Sue James (In Our Time, Jan. 13, 2005)

 
Baruch Spinoza
Cognition
Consciousness studies
Dichotomies
Enactive cognition
History of psychology
Metaphysics of mind
Neuroscience
Philosophical problems
René Descartes